CSF2RB (also known as cytokine receptor common subunit beta) is a common subunit to the following type I cytokine receptors:
GM-CSF receptor
IL-3 receptor
IL-5 receptor.

References

External links